Igor Yuryevich Borozdin (born 5 October 1988) is a former Russian professional football player.

Club career
He played in the Russian Football National League for FC Avangard Kursk in 2010.

Honours
 Russian Second Division, Zone Center best midfielder: 2009.

References

External links
 
 

1988 births
Sportspeople from Kursk
Living people
Russian footballers
Association football midfielders
Russian expatriate footballers
Expatriate footballers in Belarus
FC Chernomorets Novorossiysk players
FC Isloch Minsk Raion players
FC Dynamo Bryansk players
FC Avangard Kursk players
Belarusian Premier League players
FC Chayka Peschanokopskoye players
FC Mashuk-KMV Pyatigorsk players